Li Xiaopeng (July 27, 1981 in Changsha, Hunan) is a male Chinese gymnast, who specializes in parallel bars and vault. He currently holds 16 world titles, more than any other gymnast in China. On 29 August 2009, he was the torch bearer for the torch relay of the East Asian Games in Hong Kong.  He retired from the sport in late 2009.

Early years
He began gymnastics training at Changsha Spare-time Sports School in Hunan Province at the age of 6 and was a member of the Hunan provincial team at 12.  Li's diligence and skill soon set him apart from his peers, which could be proved by his several provincial titles.  At the age of 15, he was selected into the national team.

National team
At 16, Li Xiaopeng became China's youngest world (team) gymnastics champion ever when he and his teammates won the men's team final at the 1997 Lausanne World Championships.  At the same event, Li also received a silver medal for parallel bars, just second to his teammate Zhang Jingjin, and a bronze for floor exercise.

At the 1999 Tianjin World Championships, Li was part of the Chinese team to become men's team champion. Individually, he won his first gold medal in vault. However, his failure in parallel bars left something to be desired, which pushed him to train harder for the Sydney Olympics.

At the 2000 Sydney Olympic Games, Li and his teammates gave an outstanding performance, earning them the gold medal at the prestigious men's team event, a first for Chinese gymnasts. Li also won an individual gold medal in parallel bars.

At the 2003 Anaheim World Championships, Li Xiaopeng was the only person to win three gold medals, namely for men's team final, vault and parallel bars. Thus he was voted as the 2003 World Gymnast of the Year.

However, due to a severe foot injury, Li's performance at the 2004 Athens Olympic Games was unsatisfactory.  China finished 5th at the men's team final, and Li could only get a bronze in parallel bars, after being undefeated in major competitions since 2000. He was the fourth athlete to compete in the vault event finals, but unfortunately shuffled during the initial sprint and fell on the first jump.

Li had been suffering from a chronic ankle injury and had an operation in 2005. He rested for that whole year, refraining from participating in any competitions.

In 2006, he made a successful comeback by winning a gold in parallel bars at the São Paulo World Cup Series Final. By then he had tied with his idol, China's gymnastic legend Li Ning, by winning a record of 14 world titles.

In 2008, after suffering from toe injury, he came back and won titles for parallel bars at the two gymnastics World Cups, Cottbus and Tianjin.

After winning two gold medals for men's team and parallel bars at the Beijing Olympics, he surpassed Li Ning by holding 16 world titles, more than any other gymnasts in China. He retired in late 2009.

Competitive highlights

Influences
The Fédération Internationale de Gymnastique has named two routines after Li. They are "Li Xiaopeng hop" in vault, and "Li Xiaopeng arm hang" in parallel bars.

Personal life
He met his wife, a Chinese-American girl Li "Angel" Anqi daughter of former gymnasts Li Xiaoping and Wen Jia at the 2003 World Championship in Anaheim, California where her father served as a host and interpreter for the Chinese team. They became engaged in 2008, and married in LA on June 5, 2010. The couple held a second marriage ceremony in Beijing on July 11, 2010. Due to a problem with the visa of Li's parents, they were unable to attend the LA wedding ceremony. On January 12, 2012, they had their first child named Olivia (Li Xinqi). His second child, a son, named Max was born in June 2016.

Television shows
Li Xiaopeng and his daughter have been regular cast members on the show "Dad came back" (a version of Korean reality-variety show "Return of Superman") on which dads have to take care of their child/children without help of anyone (including their wives) in 48 hours. After the first season was aired, his daughter gained a lot of love from public and fans. He also appeared on other television shows such as the first season of The Amazing Race China and the 2016 Race the World, which he had to quit before the finale due to the expected birth of his second child.

References

External links
 
 
 
 Li Xiao Peng (Parallel bars)
 Li Xiao Peng (Vault)

1981 births
Living people
Chinese male artistic gymnasts
Gymnasts at the 2000 Summer Olympics
Gymnasts at the 2004 Summer Olympics
Gymnasts at the 2008 Summer Olympics
Medalists at the World Artistic Gymnastics Championships
Olympic bronze medalists for China
Olympic gold medalists for China
Olympic gymnasts of China
Sportspeople from Changsha
World champion gymnasts
Olympic medalists in gymnastics
Medalists at the 2008 Summer Olympics
Asian Games medalists in gymnastics
Gymnasts at the 1998 Asian Games
Gymnasts at the 2002 Asian Games
Medalists at the 2004 Summer Olympics
Medalists at the 2000 Summer Olympics
Asian Games gold medalists for China
Asian Games silver medalists for China
Asian Games bronze medalists for China
Medalists at the 1998 Asian Games
Medalists at the 2002 Asian Games
Gymnasts from Hunan
Originators of elements in artistic gymnastics
The Amazing Race contestants
Participants in Chinese reality television series